Alexandre Charles Georges Henri Arthus (March 10, 1872 – August 12, 1962) was a French sailor. He won the bronze medal in the 6m class in the 1908 Summer Olympics in London along with Louis Potheau and Pierre Rabot.

References

1872 births
1962 deaths
French male sailors (sport)
Olympic sailors of France
Olympic bronze medalists for France
Olympic medalists in sailing
Sailors at the 1908 Summer Olympics – 6 Metre
Medalists at the 1908 Summer Olympics
20th-century French people